Lukáš Hlava (born 10 September 1984 in Harrachov) is a Czech ski jumper who has competed since 2002. At the 2010 Winter Olympics in Vancouver, he finished seventh in the team large hill event and 38th in the individual normal hill events.

Hlava's best finish at the FIS Nordic World Ski Championships was fifth in the team large hill event at Liberec in 2009. His best individual finish was 20th in the individual normal hill event at those same championship.

In Lahti, he finished third and stood on the podium in the World Cup for the first time in his career.

He is the younger brother of former ski jumper Jakub Hlava.

References
 

1984 births
Living people
People from Harrachov
Czech male ski jumpers
Olympic ski jumpers of the Czech Republic
Ski jumpers at the 2010 Winter Olympics
Ski jumpers at the 2014 Winter Olympics
Ski jumpers at the 2018 Winter Olympics
Sportspeople from the Liberec Region